Delta Technical College (Delta Tech) is a private for-profit career college in Horn Lake, Mississippi. It was founded in 2004 and is a branch school of Midwest Technical Institute based in Springfield, Illinois. Delta Technical College has campuses in Horn Lake and Ridgeland.

The college is regulated and licensed to operate by the Mississippi Commission on Proprietary School and College Registration and License #C-624.

References

External links

Private universities and colleges in Mississippi
Education in DeSoto County, Mississippi
Vocational education in the United States
Educational institutions established in 2004
Buildings and structures in DeSoto County, Mississippi
2004 establishments in Mississippi